HMS Defiance was a 58-gun fourth rate ship of the line of the Royal Navy, built to the dimensions laid out in the 1741 proposals of the 1719 Establishment at Deptford, and launched on 12 October 1744.

In November 1745 she encountered her fellow Royal Navy vessel . The crew of both vessels mistook the other for a French man-o-war and opened fire at long range. The engagement ended after half an hour, when crew aboard Defiance observed British markings on the cannonballs striking their ship and signaled for a truce.

During the Seven Years' War, the Defiance was part of the 1758 Royal Navy fleet assembled to attack the French fortress at Louisbourg. Before the siege, she captured a French ship that was carrying much-needed provisions and military supplies from France to the fortress.

Defiance was sold out of the Navy in 1766.

Notes

References

Lavery, Brian (2003) The Ship of the Line – Volume 1: The development of the battlefleet 1650–1850. Conway Maritime Press. .

Ships of the line of the Royal Navy
1744 ships
Ships built in Deptford